John Eric Yang (born February 10, 1958) is an American news correspondent, commentator and as of February 2016, a special correspondent for the PBS NewsHour.  He previously worked for NBC as a correspondent and commentator, covering issues for all NBC News programming, including NBC Nightly News with Brian Williams, Today, and MSNBC. He has also worked for ABC News as a correspondent.

Early life and education
Yang was born in Chillicothe, Ohio, on February 10, 1958. He attended high school at Western Reserve Academy, a private, coeducational boarding school in Hudson, Ohio, graduating in 1975. He went to college at Wesleyan University, where he graduated cum laude in 1980. Yang quickly became involved in political journalism, often writing about American politics and the United States Congress.

Career

Early, print journalism
After college, Yang got a job as a reporter with The Boston Globe, where he worked from 1980 to 1981. Yang moved on to Time, where he worked as a correspondent from 1981 to 1986, and he also served as a reporter for The Wall Street Journal from 1986 to 1990.

In 1990 Yang became a reporter and editor at The Washington Post, where he worked for nearly ten years. As a reporter he covered domestic politics, including Congress and the White House. As an editor he directed coverage of economic policy in the paper's business section and also directed political features in the Style section.

Television
In November 1999, Yang left The Post when he was offered a job as a Washington, D.C.-based correspondent at ABC News. In 2000, he became well known for covering the George W. Bush presidential campaign during Republican Party primaries. After the primaries and until election, Yang covered the Al Gore campaign, and he continued to cover the campaign during the Florida election recount. After the September 11, 2001 terrorist attacks, Yang frequently reported live from the Pentagon and worked as part of the ABC News team that was awarded a Peabody Award and Alfred I. DuPont-Columbia University Award for its 9/11 coverage.

From 2002 to 2004, Yang was transferred to Jerusalem, working as ABC's Middle East correspondent. He covered every major development of the Israeli-Palestinian conflict, including suicide bombings and Israeli military operations in Palestinian territories. In April 2005, Yang covered the death of Pope John Paul II, working with the ABC News team that also won an Alfred I. duPont-Columbia University Award for its coverage of the event.

In January 2007 Yang joined NBC News as a correspondent. In November 2007, he was named NBC News White House correspondent. He covered the 2008 presidential race for NBC Nightly News with Brian Williams.

In 2009, Yang was transferred from NBC News' Washington bureau to its Chicago bureau. "NBC is moving me from the city of big egos to the city of broad shoulders," Yang told colleagues in a note.

In February 2016, Yang began a position to work as a correspondent for the PBS NewsHour. He serves as the anchor for PBS NewsHour Weekend since December 31, 2022.

Personal life
Yang is openly gay. In 2013, while working for NBC News' Chicago bureau, he bought a three-bedroom condominium in the Lake View neighborhood.

See also 

 PBS NewsHour

References

External links
Profile at PBS NewsHour website

1958 births
Living people
American journalists of Asian descent
American television reporters and correspondents
American male non-fiction writers
NBC News people
Peabody Award winners
People from Chillicothe, Ohio
Wesleyan University alumni
American LGBT journalists
American LGBT broadcasters
20th-century American non-fiction writers
21st-century American journalists
21st-century American non-fiction writers
American LGBT people of Asian descent
LGBT people from Ohio
PBS people
Western Reserve Academy alumni
People from Chicago
Journalists from Ohio
Journalists from Illinois
20th-century American male writers
21st-century American male writers